Louisiana School for the Visually Impaired (LSVI) is a PK12 state-operated school located at 2888 Brightside Lane in Baton Rouge, Louisiana, United States. The school has both blind and other visually impaired students, and shares its campus with the Louisiana School for the Deaf.

It has dormitory facilities.

Athletics
LSVI athletics competes in the LHSAA.

References

External links
 

Public K-12 schools in Louisiana
Schools for the blind in the United States
Schools in Baton Rouge, Louisiana
Public boarding schools in the United States
Boarding schools in Louisiana